La Capital Department (Spanish: Departamento La Capital) may refer to some departments of Argentine provinces:

 La Capital Department, Santa Fe (Santa Fe Province)
 La Capital Department, San Luis (San Luis Province)

See also
 Capital Department (disambiguation), the most utilized form

Department name disambiguation pages